If I Stay (Original Motion Picture Soundtrack) is the soundtrack album to the 2014 film of the same name released by WaterTower Music on August 19, 2014. The album features a compilation of songs from The Orwells, Tanlines, Lucius, Odessa, Ane Brun, Linnea Olsson, Sonic Youth, Beck, Tom Odell, Ben Howard. The fictional band Willamette Stone also contributed to the album, which were played by Vancouver-based alternative rock band Hawking, and produced by indie rock producer Adam Lasus. The songs performed by the band were written specifically for the film.

The album received generally positive reviews from critics, and music listeners and peaked at number 54 on the Billboard 200 in the United States, and number 77 in Australia. A vinyl edition of the album was released on October 23, 2014.

Reception 
Timothy Monger of Allmusic mentioned the soundtrack as "an enjoyable mix of melodic, guitar-based indie rock and acoustic ballads". Writing for ABC News, Allan Raible compared the soundtrack to the music of The Perks of Being a Wallflower (2012), Garden State (2004) and The Bling Ring (2013), as it is "obviously constructed to compliment the specific tone of the movie above all else". He concluded "While this soundtrack plays with expected conventions of the teen-romance genre, it also takes some clever, unexpected chances."

Bruce E. Steele of Asheville Citizen-Times reviewed the soundtrack, saying "The soundtrack leans toward pop rock a la 1993 — Beck, Smashing Pumpkins, Sonic Youth — and Adam’s supposedly punk-inspired band is actually reminiscent of Goo Goo Dolls’ better songs. With the AAA tunes and two near-perfect 30-something parents (Mireille Enos and Joshua Leonard, both adorable in the extensive flashbacks), “If I Stay” plays as much to moms as to actual adolescents. Speaking of music: Any teen movie that teases out deep feelings from pieces by Bach, Saint-Saens and Beethoven gets bonus points — even if the movie’s corporate handlers were too squeamish to put the cello music on the standard soundtrack album."

Three of the original songs: "Heart Like Yours", "I Never Wanted To Go" and "Mind", performed by Williamette Stone were shortlisted for the 87th Academy Awards, but could not get selected.

Track listing

Charts

Release history

References 

2014 soundtrack albums
Pop soundtracks
Rock soundtracks
Classical albums
Rhythm and blues albums
WaterTower Music soundtracks